Nadezhda may refer to:

Nadezhda (given name), people with the given name Nadezhda
Nadezhda (satellite), a series of Russian navigation satellites, of which one was launched in 1998
2071 Nadezhda, an asteroid
Nadezhda (cockroach), the first Earth creature to produce offspring that had been conceived in space
Lada Nadezhda, a minivan produced by AvtoVAZ
Nadezhda, a bandy club in Birobidzhan, Russia

Places
Nadezhda, Sofia, a municipality, part of Sofia, Bulgaria
Nadezhda Strait, Okhotsk Sea
Nadezhda Island, Sitka County, Alaska

Ships
STS Nadezhda, a Russian sail training ship, sister of STS Mir
Nadezhda (1802 Russian ship), a Russian sloop
Bulgarian torpedo gunboat Nadezhda

See also
Nadège
Nadezhdinsky (disambiguation)